Bernhard Steffen may refer to:

 Bernhard Steffen (footballer) (born 1937), German footballer
 Bernhard Steffen (computer scientist) (born 1958), German computer scientist

 Bernard Joseph Steffen (1907 – 1980), American artist